Death Certificate is the second studio album by American rapper Ice Cube. It was released on October 29, 1991, through Lench Mob Records and Priority Records. The production on the album was primarily handled by Sir Jinx, DJ Pooh and Ice Cube. The album was supported by two singles: "Steady Mobbin'" and "True to the Game".

Due to some of its racially and politically charged content, and Ice Cube's acerbic statements on drug dealing, racial profiling, and the right to keep and bear arms, the album was the source of both critical acclaim and much controversy upon its release. Death Certificate was a commercial success, debuting at number two on the US Billboard 200 chart, selling 105,000 copies in its first week. The album was certified platinum by the Recording Industry Association of America (RIAA) in December 1991.

Background
The recording and writing for Death Certificate began in late 1990, and carried on throughout most of 1991. While making the album, Ice Cube was also heavily involved in several other projects, including Yo-Yo's debut album Make Way for the Motherlode, his younger cousin Del tha Funkee Homosapien's I Wish My Brother George Was Here, and perhaps more importantly, his film debut, Boyz n the Hood, in which he co-starred with Cuba Gooding, Jr. and Laurence Fishburne. Similar to AmeriKKKa's Most Wanted, Ice Cube was very active in the album's production, though the overall sound differed. Unlike AmeriKKKa's Most Wanted, which featured the Bomb Squad's hard edged beats, Death Certificate featured a slightly more West Coast-oriented sound in comparison, with heavy use of 70's Funk and Soul samples. A number of the tracks also use samples taken from acts such as Zapp (Ohio) and Fishbone (California).

Content
Death Certificate was roughly organized as two thematic elements of a larger whole, and opens with Cube's explanation: "The Death Side: a mirror image of where we are today; The Life Side: a vision of where we need to go." The first half, therefore, is replete with the tales of drug dealing, whore-mongering and violence expected of a gangsta rap album in 1991. The sleeve booklet also included the following quote from Ice Cube, which showed the influence of the Nation of Islam on his work.
The reason I say nigga is because we are mentally dead even in 1991.  We have limited knowledge of self, so it leads to a nigga mentality.  The best place for a young Black male or female is the Nation of Islam.  Soon as we as a people use our knowledge of self to our advance we will then be able to become and be called Blacks.

The Death Side's "A Bird in the Hand" laments a young man's slide into a life of drug-dealing for economic survival.

Do I have to sell me a whole lot of crack
For decent shelter and clothes on my back?
Or should I just wait for help from Bush?
Or Jesse Jackson and Operation PUSH?

The Life Side's "Black Korea" threatens rioting and arson alongside Black entrepreneurship as a response to the preponderance of Korean-owned grocery stores in ghettos across the United States. The track was seen as a response to the killing of Latasha Harlins, a 15-year-old African American girl who was shot to death by a Korean-American store owner on March 16, 1991, in an altercation over a bottle of orange juice. Since the release of the track preceded the 1992 Los Angeles riots, in which many of the people targeted were of Korean descent, Ice Cube was accused of inciting racism by African Americans towards Asians.

The track "Look Who's Burnin'" tells of the dangers of sexually transmitted infection in low income neighborhoods, while "Alive on Arrival" tells the story of a young man caught in the crossfire of a gang shootout who slowly bleeds to death while in a hospital waiting room, being questioned by police. "Color Blind" preaches neutrality and brotherhood between gangs, such as the Bloods and Crips. Although Ice Cube's previous album avoided direct attacks on N.W.A, Death Certificate contained "True to the Game" and most notably "No Vaseline", which were diss tracks aimed at his former bandmates.

Unlike Ice Cube's other albums, Death Certificate was not released in a censored version. The tracks "Steady Mobbin'", "True To The Game", and "Givin' up the Nappy Dug Out", were, however, recorded with clean lyrics and released for airplay.

Release
The album was originally released on October 29, 1991. It was highly anticipated with over one million advanced orders. In 2003, Priority Records re-released Death Certificate with the bonus track "How to Survive in South Central", which originally appeared on the Boyz n the Hood soundtrack. Death Certificate included the diss track "No Vaseline" which is a response to his former hip hop group N.W.A, and their album Niggaz4Life which included direct and indirect diss tracks and verses to Ice Cube. "No Vaseline" is considered to be one of the greatest diss tracks of all time due to its explicit and direct subject matter towards the members of the group.

The album was re-released for the 25th anniversary edition on June 9, 2017, by Interscope Records after Cube announced signing to the label in late May 2017.

Controversy
In 1991, the Oregon Liquor Control Commission banned a poster for St. Ides Malt Liquor, which Ice Cube endorsed at the time, that displayed Ice Cube holding a can of St. Ides and flashing a gang sign.
In the September 2006 issue of FHM, Ice Cube stated in an interview that he did not regret the controversial statements made on the album.

Due to fear that laws against racial incitement in the United Kingdom could see the album banned, the original United Kingdom release removed the tracks "Black Korea" and "No Vaseline". Island Records, the distributor of this version of the album, deleted these tracks with the consent of Priority Records, but not Ice Cube himself. "We're very excited about Ice Cube", said Island MD Marc Marot, "but on a personal level I just could not take those two songs. I understand that self-censorship after the NWA case puts us in a strange position, but we're not going to support minority racism or antisemitism. We came to a compromise with Profile that was acceptable." The tracks have since been reinstated on a CD reissue readily available in the UK.

Critical reception

Death Certificate received critical acclaim. AllMusic called it "even harder and angrier than AmeriKKKa's Most Wanted ... It continues the sharp insights and unflinching looks at contemporary urban lifestyles that his solo debut only hinted at; in short, it's hardcore without any gangsta posturing." They also call it "funkier, noisier, and more musically effective (than AmeriKKKa)." Initially giving a four-and-a-half out of five "mic" rating, The Source retrospectively awarded Death Certificate full marks in a list of "5 Mic Hip-Hop Classics", in its 150th issue.

"His homophobia may be irksome", wrote Ted Kessler in Select, "but the shock value of these views has been blunted by lesser rappers. It's the sublime combination of '70s P-Funk and Ice Cube's excellent, taut delivery of rhymes calculated to jolt that pleases." Spin wrote that it "integrates vitriolic politics with raw street knowledge" and "achieves an almost George Clinton-esque sense of celebratory freakiness".

"There's a rule in music journalism at the moment", observed the hip-hop fanzine Louder Than A Bomb!. "It says that every Ice-T/N.W.A./Ice Cube record must be described as something like 'a grisly and uncompromising portrait of life in the ghetto'… O.G. was the last. Death Certificate is the next. [But] you can't shut your eyes while listening and imagine the ghetto. It's just a lot of songs about shooting, shagging and N.W.A."

Death Certificate received a meager $18,000 promotion budget, and neither of its singles, "Steady Mobbin'" and "True to the Game", received much airplay, although they did receive music video treatment.

Accolades
Ranked #8 in MTV's Greatest Hip-Hop Albums of All Time list in 2005
Included in The Sources 100 Best Rap Albums list in 1998
Ranked #17 in The Sources The Critic's Top 100 Black Music Album's of All Time list in 2006
Ranked #12 in About.com's 100 Greatest Hip-Hip Albums list in 2008
Ranked #5 in ego trips Hip Hop's 25 Greatest Albums by Year 1980–98 list in 1999
Ranked #20 in Dance De Lux'''s 25 Best Hip-Hop Records list in 2001
Ranked #16 in The Village Voices Best Albums of the Year list in 1991
Ranked #37 in New Musical Expresss Best Albums of the Year list in 1991
Ranked #8 in Hip Hop Connections reader-voted The Phat FortyIncluded in Vibes 100 Essential Albums of the 20th Century in 1999
Included in Rhapsody's list of the top "coke rap" albums of all time in 2010.

Commercial performance
Death Certificate debuted at number two on the US Billboard 200 chart, selling 105,000 copies in its first week. This became Ice Cube's first US top-ten debut. The album also debuted at number one on the US Top R&B/Hip-Hop Albums chart. On December 20, 1991, the album was certified platinum by the Recording Industry Association of America (RIAA) for sales of over a million copies. It was certified only two months after the album was released. As of March 2020, the album has sold over two million copies in the United States.

On September 4, 2015, Death Certificate went back on the Billboard 200 chart and ranked at number 99 with 14,000 sales in that week; also, Greatest Hits and AmeriKKKa's Most Wanted came back on the Billboard 200 in that week with Greatest Hits charting at number 118 with 11,920 sales and AmeriKKKa's Most Wanted at number 150 with 8,300 sales.

 Track listing 

Personnel

Ice Cube – performer, producer, executive producer, mixing
Khalid Muhammad – performer
Deadly Threat – performer
Kam – performer
WC and the Maad Circle – performer
King Tee – performer
J-Dee – performer
DJ Bobcat Bobby Ervin – producer
Sir Jinx – producer, mixing
Boogie Men – producer

Bob Morse – engineer, mixing
Frank Macek – engineer, mixing
Mr. Stoker (Andy Growcott) – engineer
DJ Pooh – mixing
Daryll Dobson – mixing
Brian Gardner – mastering
Mario Castellanos – photography
Kevin Hosmann – art direction

Charts

Weekly charts

Year-end charts

Certifications

See also
List of number-one R&B albums of 1991 (U.S.)

ReferencesOther sources'''

External links
Death Certificate at Discogs
"Ice KKKube's Aesthetikkk Merit: Big Fukkking Deal" by Robert Christgau
Album Review at RapReviews.com

Ice Cube albums
1991 albums
Anti-Korean sentiment in the United States
Priority Records albums
Political hip hop albums
Political music albums by American artists
Race-related controversies in music